Madison High School is a public high school located in Madison, Ohio, United States. The only high school in the Madison Local School District, it was established in 1895.

Classes
Madison High offers a wide variety of classes to its students. Some of said classes are biology, chemistry, physics, earth sciences, integrated math 1-4, algebras 1 & 2, geometry, calculus, wood shop, engineering classes, and many others.

Extracurricular activities
The school offers many clubs and activities for students to take part in. Groups such as key club, technology club, drama club, Model UN, newspaper, National Honors Society, and many others are available to students.

Madison High School is a part of the Western Reserve Conference.  Madison's main rivals are Perry, Geneva, Riverside, and Chardon High Schools. Madison currently offers many sports for both boys and girls. They include, for boys, golf, soccer, Cross Country, basketball, swimming, wrestling, baseball, football, track and field, tennis, and cheerleading.

As it is with most high schools, girls at Madison also have the opportunity to engage in many sports, which include tennis, volleyball, soccer, Cross Country, basketball, swimming, softball, track and field, and cheerleading.

The Blue Streaks softball team had a tremendous run in the OHSAA tournament in the 2016-2017 school year. The ladies won a District title and came second in the Western Reserve Conference.

Notes and references

External links
 Official site
 District site

High schools in Lake County, Ohio
Educational institutions established in 1970
Public high schools in Ohio